Deutschland was a German fishing trawler that was requisitioned by the Kriegsmarine in the Second World War for use as a Vorpostenboot. She served as V 404 Deutschland and V 403 Deutschland. She struck a mine and sank off the Dutch coast in August 1940.

Description
The engine was made by Deschimag Seebeckwerft, Wesermünde, Germany. It was rated at 95nhp. The engine powered a single screw propeller driven via a low pressure turbine and double reduction gearing.

History
The ship was built as yard number 521 by Deschimag Seekbeckwerft, Wesermünde for the Hanseatische Hochseefischerei AG, Bremerhaven. She was launched in July 1934 and completed on 4 August. The fishing boat registration BX 247 was allocated. She was allocated the Code Letters DQPY.

Deutschland was requisitioned by the Kriegsmarine on 3 September 1939 for use as a vorpostenboot. She was allocated to 4 Vorpostenflotille as V 404 Deutschland. On 16 October she was redesignated V 403 Deutschland. On 5 September 1940, she struck a mine and sank in the Westerschelde off Vlissingen, Zeeland, Netherlands. Four of her crew were killed.

References

Sources

1934 ships
Ships built in Bremen (state)
Fishing vessels of Germany
Auxiliary ships of the Kriegsmarine
Maritime incidents in September 1940
Ships sunk by mines
World War II shipwrecks in the North Sea